Youngblood is the fourth album by Norwegian rock band Audrey Horne, released in 2013. The album marked a stark change in direction for the band, who largely abandoned the post-grunge style typical of their previous albums in favor of a double lead guitar harmony sound, reminiscent of bands such as Thin Lizzy.

Track listing
All tracks written by Audrey Horne.
"Redemption Blues" - 4:37
"Straight into Your Grave" - 3:50
"Youngblood" - 4:36
"There Goes a Lady" - 3:52
"Show and Tell" - 4:47
"Cards with the Devil" - 4:07
"Pretty Little Sunshine" - 3:42
"The Open Sea" - 4:24
"This Ends Here" - 3:51
"The King Is Dead" - 5:13
Bonus tracks
"I Wanna Know You" - 3:15
"This Ends Here" (Demo) - 3:59
"The Open Sea" (Demo) - 4:17

Personnel

Audrey Horne
Toschie - vocals
Ice Dale (Arve Isdal) - guitars
Thomas Tofthagen - guitars
Kjetil Greve - drums
Espen Lien - bass

Additional Personnel
Kim Gulbrandsen - keyboards

Production
Produced by Magnet
Engineered by Iver Sandøy
Mixed by Jorgen Dupermann
Recorded at Duper Studio, Solslottet Studio and Hermetrix Studio

Charts

References

2013 albums
Audrey Horne (band) albums